Seasons of the Heart is a 1993 Christian drama film starring Leigh Lombardi and Sam Hennings.

Plot
Martha and Jed Richards live in Oregon in 1862. They and their two young daughters moved there to make a new life, unfortunately both of their daughters died from yellow fever along the way. This has left Martha an emotional wreck, and she is unable to move on with her life. That is until an orphan named Danny comes to live with them. Jed immediately accepts Danny as his son, but Martha is still too upset to be able to love him. As time passes, however, she finds herself more and more able to accept him as part of the family.

Production
Parts of the film were shot in Salt Lake City, Utah.

References

External links 
 

1993 films
Films scored by Marvin Hamlisch
Films about evangelicalism
1993 drama films
Films shot in Salt Lake City
1990s English-language films